Mother City SkyDiving - Cape Town is a sports skydiving drop zone licensed by the Parachute Association of South Africa (PASA) and the South African Civil Aviation Authority (CAA).

Status

The drop zone provides a service for experienced sport skydivers, and offers Tandem Introductory Skydiving.

Operations

Operations are conducted in accordance with the PASA Manual of Procedures (MOPs) and part 105 of the South African Civil Aviation Authority (CAA) Regulation, and as per terms and conditions laid down by Mother City SkyDiving.

Malmesbury Show

At part of the Malmesbury Show the team has taken a number of local celebrities on a tandem skydive as part of the main event.

 Swartland Mayor Tijimen van Essen was the first to tandem skydive into the Malmesbury Show in 2015.
 In 2016, Alderman James Vos, the then Shadow Minister for Tourism, made a tandem skydive over the show.
 In 2017 local musician Pietman die skot arrived from the sky into the event.
 In 2018 Bok Radio presenter LeLue vander Sandt jumped into the show.

Interschools

In 2019 the team performed parachute displays into local Interschools Rugby competitions: Swartland vs Hugenote; Durbanville vs Stellenberg; and, what is regarded as the largest Interschools rugby competition in South Africa, Paarl Gimnasium vs Paarl Boys High.

Awards

In May 2020, Mother City SkyDiving's "Let's Jump out of a Plane" video submission for The International Tourism Film Festival Africa (ITFFA) won first place in the category Sport & Adventure Tourism.

The ITFFA winning video was subsequently entered to the International Committee of Tourism Film Festivals (CIFFT) for international adjudication and screening.

Records

In 2018 South African musician, DJ and Saxophonist George Sax became the highest and fastest saxophonist in the world when he played his saxophone in freefall to produce a music video for his 'Touch the Sun' track, featuring Si-Anne on vocals, at the drop zone. at Mother City SkyDiving.

Location

Mother City SkyDiving is situated at Diepkloof Airfield, adjacent to the N7 Highway 70 km north of Cape Town and 12 km north of Malmesbury, in the Swartland Municipality of the Western Cape Province of South Africa.

See also
Parachute Association of South Africa
Parachuting

References

External links
 Mother City SkyDiving Official Website
 Parachute Association of South Africa Website
 Mother City SkyDiving Google Maps

Parachuting in South Africa
Sport in the Western Cape
Sport in Cape Town
Tourist attractions in Cape Town
Sports venues in the Western Cape
Tourist attractions in South Africa